Galemys is a genus of mole containing the living Pyrenean desman (Galemys pyrenaicus) and several fossil species.

Many of these extinct species were far more widespread than the living species; for example, the Early Pleistocene Galemys kormosi was found in freshwater habitats throughout much of Europe, including the British Isles. Galemys probably evolved in the Early Pliocene from a species in the extinct genus Archaeodesmana.

References

Mammal genera
Mammal genera with one living species